Ari Hest (born 16 June 1979) is an American singer-songwriter from the Bronx borough of New York.

Biography

Early life and education
Hest's father is a college music professor and his mother a cantor. His older brother, Danny, is Hest's former manager. Hest took piano lessons as a child and later taught himself to play guitar. Hest attended Cornell University in Ithaca, NY beginning in 1999 and later transferred to New York University, where he received a degree in Communications in 2002.

Career
Hest released an EP, Incomplete and two albums, Come Home and Story After Story all independently as he grew his fan base touring colleges and universities around the U.S. In March 2004, Hest signed a recording contract with Columbia and recorded the album Someone To Tell and a five-song EP "Guilty Hearts EP" in the fall of 2005.  His next EP was called The Green Room Sessions, a home spun recording entirely played and produced on his own. Shortly after releasing that,  he worked with producer Mitchell Froom on "The Break-In", which was his last release on Columbia.
 
As an independent artist once again in 2008, Hest created 52, a subscription based service in which he wrote, recorded and released a new song every week for a year. In 2009, he released Twelve Mondays, a collection of 12 fan-selected songs from those 52, remixed.

Between 2011 and 2014, Hest released three more albums - Sunset Over Hope Street (2011), The Fire Plays (2012) and Shouts and Whispers
(2014). Several songs from these albums have appeared in films and TV shows.

In 2016, Ari co-wrote a number of songs with Judy Collins, and the two released an album of duets June 3 entitled Silver Skies Blue, after two years of on-and-off touring together. The album earned Hest his first Grammy Award nomination (it was Collins' first nomination in 40 years). Silver Skies Blue was nominated for Best Folk Album at the 59th Annual Grammy Awards in 2017 but lost to Undercurrent by Sarah Jarosz. This is not Hest's first collaboration - he has two other projects: The Open Sea with Rosi Golan, and more recently, the Brazilian guitar inspired Bluebirds of Paradise with Chrissi Poland.

Discography
 Incomplete (EP, 1999), Project 4 
 Come Home (2001), Project 4 
 Story After Story (2002). Project 4 
 Someone to Tell (2004), Columbia 
 Guilty Hearts (EP, 2005), Columbia 
 The Green Room Sessions (EP, 2006), Columbia 
 I've Got You (Download only single, 2007), Columbia/Red Ink
 The Break-In (2007), Columbia/Red Ink
 Live at the Quick Center (EP, 2008), Project 4
 52 (2008), Project 4 
 Twelve Mondays (2009), Project 4 
 Sunset Over Hope Street (2011), Downtown 
 The Fire Plays (2012), Project 4 
 Shouts and Whispers (2014), Project 4 
 Silver Skies Blue with Judy Collins (2016), Cleopatra 
 Natural (2017), Ari Hest
 Against The Sky (2020), Ari Hest

Soundtrack and other albums
 Consistency, Live from the Village Underground (2002), Project 4, included with first 1,000 copies of “Story After Story”
 Winter Break: The Movie Soundtrack (2003), Various Artists, with “Strangers Again” from Ari Hest
 DecentXposure: Volume One (2003). Various Artists, with "Consistency" from Ari Hest
 The Lincoln Lawyer soundtrack (2011) Various Artists, with "Now" from Ari Hest
 The Open Sea (with Rosi Golan), "Little Apple" EP (2010)

References

External links
 Official website 
 Biography at Star Pulse.   
 Live Music Archive
 Interview at Stereo Subversion
 Interview with Sound Bites Dog E-Zine

1979 births
American male singer-songwriters
Singer-songwriters from New York (state)
Cornell University alumni
Living people
Horace Mann School alumni
New York University alumni
People from the Bronx
21st-century American singers
21st-century American male singers